David Erikson (born Anton Otto David Eriksson; 26 May 1899 – 22 June 1973) was a Swedish stage and film actor. He appeared in more than 70 films between 1938 and 1957.

Selected filmography

 Thunder and Lightning (1938)
 Dollar (1938)
 Styrman Karlssons flammor (1938)
 Kiss Her! (1940)
 The Train Leaves at Nine (1941)
 Lasse-Maja (1941)
 Fransson the Terrible (1941)
 Dunungen (1941)
 Dangerous Ways (1942)
 The Sixth Shot (1943)
 She Thought It Was Him (1943)
 Sonja (1943)
 The Journey Away (1945)
 The Österman Brothers' Virago (1945)
 Kvarterets olycksfågel (1947)
 The People of Simlang Valley (1947)
 Soldier's Reminder (1947)
 Neglected by His Wife (1947)
 Maria (1947)
 Lars Hård (1948)
 Restaurant Intim (1950)
 The Kiss on the Cruise (1950)
 Blondie, Beef and the Banana (1952)
 Dance in the Smoke (1954)
 Simon the Sinner (1954)
 Voyage in the Night (1955)
 Uncle's (1955)
 Night Child (1956)
 A Dreamer's Journey (1957)

References

External links

1899 births
1973 deaths
Swedish male film actors
Swedish male stage actors
20th-century Swedish male actors
Male actors from Stockholm